Mad World (Cantonese: 一念無明) is a 2016 Hong Kong drama film directed by Wong Chun and starring Shawn Yue, Eric Tsang, Elaine Jin and Charmaine Fong. It is Wong's directorial debut after winning the First Feature Film Initiative. It was selected as the Hong Kong entry for the Best Foreign Language Film at the 90th Academy Awards, but it was not nominated.

Premise
Tung, a former financial analyst who is struggling with bipolar disorder, is placed in the custody of his truck-driver father after being dismissed from a mental health institution.

Cast
Shawn Yue as Tung—a mentally ill stockbroker
Eric Tsang as Tung's father—a cross-town trucker who takes in his son
Elaine Jin as Tung's mother—mentally ill woman who was killed by her son
Charmaine Fong as Jenny—Tung's former fiancee
Wong Chun as Tung's younger brother (voice)

Development 
Wong and Chan cited Cageman (1992), about an impoverished community living in cage homes, as a major influence.

Production 
As the film was selected by the First Feature Film Initiative (along with Weeds on Fire and Opus 1), they were unable to procure outside investments. Actors Eric Tsang and Shawn Yue both waived their salaries when they joined the cast.

Release 
The film premiered at the 2016 Toronto International Film Festival. It opened in Hong Kong cinemas on 30 March 2017. The film grossed almost 10x its budget in theaters. A fraction of the profits were used to compensate actors Eric Tsang and Shawn Yue, who waived their salaries, and the few crew members who worked for free.

Reception 
Clarence Tsui for The Hollywood Reporter wrote, "While not exactly a full-fledged success, Mad World offers an intimate showcase of a promising director, an actor who can do much more than he’s usually asked to, and a kind of non-manic storytelling that pays for those who are patient enough to pay attention." Edmund Lee of the South China Morning Post gave the film 3.5/5 stars. He wrote, "Mad World is not quite the profound reflection of reality its makers intended it to be, but despite its flaws this is a brave film."

The film was selected as the Hong Kong entry for the Best Foreign Language Film at the 90th Academy Awards, but it was not nominated.

Awards and nominations

See also
 List of submissions to the 90th Academy Awards for Best Foreign Language Film
 List of Hong Kong submissions for the Academy Award for Best Foreign Language Film

References

External links

2016 films
Hong Kong drama films
2010s Cantonese-language films
2016 drama films
Films about bipolar disorder
Winners of the First Feature Film Initiative
2010s Hong Kong films